Rebecca M. Nabutola (born January 17, 1959) is the former Permanent Secretary (PS) of Kenya's Ministry of Tourism and Wildlife. Nabutola studied at the Institute of Social Studies, Hague, earning a diploma in International Relations and Development, and at the University of Nairobi, where she earned a Bachelor of Arts.

References

1959 births
Living people
University of Nairobi alumni
Kenyan women in politics
Place of birth missing (living people)
International Institute of Social Studies alumni